Steven Jacob "Jake" Sandvig (born September 8, 1986) is an American actor and nurse. He is best known for playing Hugh Pyne in Twenty Good Years and Preston Shackleton in Cracking Up. In 2009, he made a guest appearance in Ruby & the Rockits. He is also known for his roles in Easy A and Sky High.

Filmography

Guest appearances

References

External links

Official Site

1986 births
American male child actors
American male film actors
American male television actors
American people of Norwegian descent
Living people
People from Clovis, California
20th-century American male actors
21st-century American male actors
Male actors from California